In the Aztec military, tlacateccatl was a title roughly equivalent to general. The tlacateccatl was in charge of the tlacatecco, a military quarter in the center of the Aztec capital, Tenochtitlan. In wartime he was second-in-command to the tlatoani ("ruler", "king") and the tlacochcalcatl ("high general"). The tlacateccatl was always a member of the military order of the Cuachicqueh, "the shorn ones".

References

Aztec warfare
Aztec society
Nahuatl words and phrases